Great American Bank was an American savings and loan association based in San Diego. It was founded in 1885 as San Diego Building and Loan Association, the first S&L in Southern California. Until the 1980s, it operated for decades as San Diego Federal Savings and Loan Association. Federal regulators seized and disbanded the bank in 1991. Before the company was split apart, Great American had 213 offices operating in California, Arizona, Washington, Montana, and Colorado.

History
San Diego Building and Loan Association was founded on July 11, 1885. Its initial capital stock was $500,000 from 2,500 shares at $200 each. The company changed from a state charter to a federal charter in 1936, when it became San Diego Federal Savings and Loan Association. It began a stretch of eight mergers with other S&Ls starting in December 1980, during which it changed its name to Great American Federal Savings and Loan Association in 1982. The name change reflected their business going from four offices in San Diego County in 1970 to over 100 statewide after the completed mergers. It changed back from a federal to a state charter in 1984, when it changed its name to Great American First Savings Bank.

Great American was positioned for growth after its public stock offering in 1983 and $60 million debt offering the year after. It expanded for the first time outside the state of California by the acquisition of Home Federal Savings of Tucson, Arizona, at the peak of a speculative real estate boom in the state in 1986. In March 1987, the company expanded into the state of Colorado through the acquisition of the insolvent two-office First Security Savings & Loan Association of Grand Junction, Colorado. In October 1987, Great American expanded into the Pacific Northwest through the acquisition of  Capital Savings Bank of Olympia, Washington. At the time of the acquisition, Capital had 35 offices in Washington state and 5 offices in Montana.

After purchasing the naming rights from Great American Bancorp of Century City for $2.1 million, it changed its name to Great American Bank in 1987. In August 1988, Great American got out of the credit card business by selling its credit card division with its 188,000 Visa, Visa Gold, Mastercard and Gold Mastercard accounts to Household Bank N.A. of Salinas, a subsidiary of Household International, for an undisclosed amount.

By 1990, it had a large portfolio of bad loans and fell below its regulatory capital requirements. It sold its core of 130 California branches in a two-phase sale to Wells Fargo for $491 million before federal regulators seized the bank with its remaining 81 branches in August 1991. In May 1994, the Resolution Trust Corporation sold 58 Arizona branches to Banc One, 15 in Washington to First Interstate Bancorp, five in Washington to Sterling Financial Corporation, and two in Arizona to Washington Federal Savings while closing the remaining offices in its care.

See also
List of largest U.S. bank failures

References

Banks established in 1885
Banks based in California
Companies based in San Diego
Defunct banks of the United States
Banks disestablished in 1991